Coop Prix is a norwegian chain of 237 discount stores throughout Norway managed by Coop Norge and owned by local cooperatives. The chain was created in 1984 under the name PRIX. The chain director is Ingjerd Vestengen.

The chain markets itself with the slogan "Fort gjort!", meaning "quickly done" in English.

In 2020 the chain had a turnover of 7 399 milion NOK.

References 

Norwegian brands
Supermarkets of Norway
Retail companies established in 1990
Coop Norden